Winter Poem is the 2011 and the 7th album by Secret Garden. 
Primarily an instrumental album, it features three songs with guest vocals: Moya Brennan of Clannad fame on "The Dream", Fionnuala Gill on "Mary’s Lament", and Tracey Campbell and Espen Grjotheim on "Powered By Nature".

The lyrics to "Mary’s Lament" were written by Brendan Graham.  He previously collaborated with Rolf Løvland on You Raise Me Up  and The Gates of Dawn.
  
"Powered By Nature" and "Suite" were written for Expo 2010 Shanghai China with the first serving as Norway's official Expo-song. In connection with the record release, Secret Garden will do a concert tour in Norway. Much of the music from "Winter Poem" will be performed in-concert as well as older repertoire from the group's 16 year musical history.

Winter Poem spent thirteen weeks on the Billboard Top New Age Albums chart and ranked fifteenth on their year end chart.

Track listing

References

2011 albums
Secret Garden (duo) albums
Hearts of Space Records albums